Quincy Mauger (born March 4, 1995) is an American football safety for the BC Lions, of the Canadian Football League (CFL). He played college football at Georgia and signed with the Atlanta Falcons as an undrafted free agent in 2017.

Professional career

Atlanta Falcons
Mauger signed with the Atlanta Falcons as an undrafted free agent on May 1, 2017. He was waived/injured by the Falcons on September 2, 2017 and placed on injured reserve.

On June 11, 2018, Mauger was waived by the Falcons.

Oakland Raiders
On August 9, 2018, Mauger signed with the Oakland Raiders. He was waived on September 1, 2018.

Atlanta Legends
In 2018, Mauger signed with the Atlanta Legends of the Alliance of American Football for the 2019 season. He was placed on injured reserve on February 14, 2019. The league ceased operations in April 2019.

Ottawa Redblacks
Mauger signed with the Ottawa Redblacks of the CFL on January 18, 2022.

References

1995 births
Living people
American football safeties
Atlanta Falcons players
Georgia Bulldogs football players
Oakland Raiders players
Players of American football from Marietta, Georgia
Atlanta Legends players
The Spring League players